The Holy Priory Church Cathedral Basilica of the Military Order of Our Lady Saint Mary of the Prado of Ciudad Real is located in Ciudad Real, Autonomous region of Castile-La Mancha, Spain. Construction began in the 15th century in Gothic style, although it has elements of late Romanesque, Renaissance and Baroque styles; it has undergone many restorations with the first remodelling credited to Alfonso X (23 November 1221 – 4 April 1284) since the Romanesque period. It was completed in the mid 16th century after construction of the roof vaults. The tower was built in the early 19th century.  The structure is a monument indexed in the Spanish heritage register of Bien de Interés Cultural under the reference RI-51-0000514.

History and architecture
The oldest part of the cathedral is the Door of Forgiveness (Puerta del Perdón) from the late 13th or early 14th century, which may have been reassembled later. It was probably the door of the primitive chapel which stood on the site of today's cathedral church. The cathedral was built in stages, combining the Gothic and Renaissance styles. The apse dates to the early 15th century, the eastern section of the nave is from 1514 while the remainder was completed c. 1580. The Chapel of the Virgin and the sacristy are in the 17th-century Baroque style. The tower, rebuilt in 1825, has recently been restored. During the Spanish civil war, the cathedral was used as a military garage. As a result, many of its treasures were stolen or destroyed.

The architectural style of the Perdón doorway is in Gothic with Romanesque features while the Renaissance style is seen in the southern doorway; Perdón doorway is conjectured to belong to the reign of Alfonso X. The tower built in the 19th century is in stone masonry and it is in four tiers.

Interior

The magnificent Baroque altarpiece is the work of Giraldo de Merlo and his son-in-law, the painter Juan de Hasten. The work was continued by the brothers Cristóbal and Pedro Ruiz Delvira who charged Juan de Villaseca to implement a design created by Andrés de la Concha, completed in 1616. The altarpiece is dedicated to the Virgen of the Prado, the patron saint of Ciudad Real. The carved walnut pews are from the first half of the 18th century.
The Sacristy has many paintings. There is also a chest of drawers made in a Baroque style.

The church of Santa Maria del Prado gained the status of cathedral by papal bull in 1981.

Restorations
1967 - First restoration of the bells: bells recast, providing them with metal yokes
1983 - 1986 : Restoration of the tower
1987 - 1988 - Second restoration of the bells, recast and new mechanization
1992 - Third restoration of the bells: minor welding hood
1998 - 2002 - Restoration of the facades and the ceiling of the old sacristy
2001 - Restoration of the organ
2003 - 2004 - Restoration of the altarpiece
2009 - 2010 - Restoration of the Virgen del Prado Chapel

References

Bibliography

Sainz Magaña, E., Herrera Maldonado, E. & Almarcha Nuñez-Herrador, E., Ciudad Real y su provincia, Tomo III, Ed. Gever, Sevilla, 1997. .

External links

Santa Iglesia Prioral Basílica Catedral de las Ordenes Militares de Santa María Del Prado . With many photographs. 

Churches in Castilla–La Mancha
Bien de Interés Cultural landmarks in the Province of Ciudad Real
Ciudad Real
Tourist attractions in Castilla–La Mancha
Romanesque architecture in Castilla–La Mancha
Gothic architecture in Castilla–La Mancha
Renaissance architecture in Castilla–La Mancha
Baroque architecture in Castilla–La Mancha
Roman Catholic churches completed in 1580
16th-century Roman Catholic church buildings in Spain
Buildings and structures in Ciudad Real